Xenodasyidae is a family of worms belonging to the order Macrodasyida.

Genera:
 Chordodasiopsis Todaro, Guidi, Leasi & Tongiorgi, 2006
 Xenodasys Swedmark, 1967

References

Gastrotricha